Dockray (traditionally Dockwray) is a village in the civil parish of Matterdale, in the Eden district, in the county of Cumbria, England. In the 2011 census, the parish had 483 residents, roughlt an 8% decrease from 526 residents in 2001. Dockray is located approximately eight miles south west of Penrith, and is accessible off of the A5091 road. 

The village is popular among walkers, mostly to Aira Force, and various fells surrounding the village, most notably Gowbarrow Fell.  The village has no amenities, aside from The Royal Hotel, a local inn and restaurant.

In the Imperial Gazetteer of England and Wales of 1870, Dockwray was described as "a hamlet on the Aira rivulet, adjacent to Matterdale, in Cumberland. It commands a fine view over Ulles-water."

See Also 
 Listed buildings in Matterdale

References

Hamlets in Cumbria
Eden District